Guangdong Medical University is a medical school in Guangdong province, China.

History
Guangdong Medical College, the former Zhanjiang Branch of the Sun Yatsen Medical College, was established on May23, 1958. In February 1964, the college was renamed Zhanjiang Medical College, then in September 1992, with the approval of the Provincial Government of Guangdong, it was renamed Guangdong Medical College.

In March 2016, Guangdong Medical College was renamed Guangdong Medical University by the Ministry of Education of the People's Republic of China.

Location
GDMU has two campuses. The Zhanjiang campus is located in the seaport city of Zhanjiang. The Dongguan campus, which admitted its first students in 2003, is located in the scenic Songshan Lake Science and Technology and Industry Park in southern Dongguan.

References

External links
Guangdong Medical University 
Guangdong Medical University 

Educational institutions established in 1958
Universities and colleges in Zhanjiang
Universities and colleges in Dongguan
1958 establishments in China